Sebastian Patrick Quintus Rahtz (13 February 1955 – 15 March 2016) (SPQR) was a British digital humanities information professional.

Life 

Born in 1955 to Somerset-focused archaeologist Philip Rahtz, Sebastian trained in archaeology, before delving into the computing realm via Lexicon of Greek Personal Names (LGPN) in 1982. 

He was a long-term contributor to several communities in the broader digital humanities, including LGPN, TeX, computer methods in archaeology,  and the Text Encoding Initiative (TEI). Sebastian's legacy also includes the vital contributions which he made to building and maintaining much of the TEI's technical Infrastructure and related software such as their XSLT stylesheets and web-based document conversion engine OxGarage, CLAROS, the Oxford Text Archive, Text Creation Partnership and OSS Watch.

From 1999 to 2015 he worked at Oxford University Computing Services (OUCS) which in August 2012 merged with two other departments to become IT Services. He joined the department in 1999 from Elsevier, having previously been a lecturer in Humanities Computing at the University of Southampton. He became Head of the Information and Support Group in OUCS, and then joint Director (for Research) of the Academic IT Group in 2010, and a member of the senior management team. In 2014 he was appointed Chief Data Architect. He took medical retirement from IT Services in the late summer of 2015.

He died in 2016, from brain cancer.

Selected works
 Kicking and screaming: Challenges and advantages of bringing TCP texts into line with Text Encoding Initiative. J. Cummings and S. Rahtz, in Bodleian Libraries, University of Oxford, "Revolutionizing Early Modern Studies"? The Early English Books Online Text Creation Partnership, (2012). Retrieved from http://ora.ox.ac.uk/objects/uuid:f9667884-220b-4ec9-bb2f-c79044302399
 The LaTeX Web Companion: Integrating TeX, HTML, and XML. M. Goossens, S. P. Q. Rahtz, and S. Rahtz. Addison-Wesley 
 Guide to LaTeX. H. Kopka, P. W. Daly, and S. P. Q. Rahtz. Addison-Wesley
 The LaTeX companion. F. Mittelbach, M. Goossens, J. Braams, D. Carlisle, and C. Rowley. Addison-Wesley
 LaTeX: Einführung. H. Kopka and S. Rahtz. Addison-Wesley
 The LaTeX Graphics Companion: Illustrating Documents with TeX and Postscript (Tools and Techniques for Computer Typesetting). M. Goossens, F. Mittelbach, S. Rahtz. D. Roegel, and H. Voss. Addison-Wesley
 A style option for rotated objects in LaTeX (1992), 156-180. S. Rahtz and L. Barroca.
 Archaeology and the Information Age: A global perspective (1992), P. Reilly and S. Rahtz (eds.), One World Archaeology. Routledge.

Impact 
In September 2016, Oxford University ran a whole-day event celebrating his life, with speakers talking about his projects. Many of the talks are available as podcasts.

Further reading
 Sebastian Rahtz (1955–2016): A brief memoir by Lou Burnard
 R.I.P. — S.P.Q.R Sebastian Patrick Quintus Rahtz (13.2.1955–15.3.2016) by Frank Mittelbach and Joan Richmond
 29.789 Sebastian Rahtz 1955–2016  by Willard McCarty

References

External links

1955 births
2016 deaths
Scientists from Bristol
Academics of the University of Southampton
People associated with the University of Oxford
Alumni of the University of London
Text Encoding Initiative
Alumni of the University of Oxford
Deaths from brain tumor
People in digital humanities